

74001–74100 

|-id=024
| 74024 Hrabě ||  || Václav Hrabě (1940–1965), a Czech poet and writer who was the most important member of the Beat Generation in former Czechoslovakia. In 1965 he interviewed Allen Ginsberg in Prague. His poem Variation on a Renaissance theme, set to music by V. Mišík, became one of the most famous Czech songs. || 
|}

74101–74200 

|-bgcolor=#f2f2f2
| colspan=4 align=center | 
|}

74201–74300 

|-bgcolor=#f2f2f2
| colspan=4 align=center | 
|}

74301–74400 

|-id=370
| 74370 Kolářjan || 1998 XJ || Jan Kolár (born 1944) started his professional career in satellite remote sensing in 1975. Since the mid-90s he actively participated in the building of the Czech-ESA relations and significantly contributed to the creation of the Czech Space Office. || 
|-id=400
| 74400 Streaky ||  || "Streaky" is the name chosen by Eve Canovan, from Lancaster, UK, as the winner of a national competition to write a story that included an "asteroid" or "asteroids", which was run by the Centre for Life in conjunction with The Times Eureka Science magazine to enthuse and engage children about space. || 
|}

74401–74500 

|-id=439
| 74439 Brenden ||  || Craig Brenden (born 1946), an American teacher of chemistry and an amateur astronomer. A co-founder of the Baton Rouge Astronomical Society, he has served the society as Vice-president many times, and was editor of Night Visions (the society newsletter) for thirty years. || 
|}

74501–74600 

|-id=503
| 74503 Madola ||  || Christian Marois (born 1974), René Doyon (born 1963) and David Lafrenière (born 1978) developed instruments that allowed seeing an extrasolar planetary system. Doyon was director of the Mt. Mégantic Observatory; Marois and Lafrenière were postdoctoral fellows at the Herzberg Institute and the University of Toronto || 
|-id=509
| 74509 Gillett ||  || Frederick C. Gillett (1937–2001), an American pioneer in infrared astronomy, who was the discoverer of the infrared excess of Vega in 1983 using the Infrared Astronomy Satellite. The Gemini North 8-meter Telescope was renamed the Frederick C. Gillett Gemini Telescope in his honor on November 18, 2002. || 
|}

74601–74700 

|-id=625
| 74625 Tieproject ||  || The Telescopes In Education (TIE) project makes it possible for many students around the world remotely to use telescopes at Mt. Wilson and Las Campanas, Chile. This is an innovative way to introduce astronomy to young people, among whom it has already developed intense interest (Src). || 
|}

74701–74800 

|-id=764
| 74764 Rudolfpešek ||  || Rudolf Pešek (1905–1989) founded the Czech school of aerodynamic engineering. An enthusiastic supporter and popularizer of spaceflight, he became an active member of the International Astronautical Federation and the International Academy of Astronautics. He invented the famous abbreviation CETI, now SETI || 
|}

74801–74900 

|-id=818
| 74818 Iten ||  || Marco Iten (born 1950), a Swiss goldsmith and a skilled model train hobbyist from Gordola. He is also an amateur astronomer who observes asteroidal occultations and meteoroid impacts on the Moon. || 
|-id=824
| 74824 Tarter || 1999 TJ16 || Jill Tarter (born 1944), an American radio-astronomer who searches for extra-terrestrial intelligence at the SETI Institute using radio telescopes while holding the Bernard M. Oliver Chair for SETI. Her career inspired Carl Sagan to write the novel Contact. She has also encouraged thousands to assist SETI discovery using their home computers. || 
|}

74901–75000 

|-bgcolor=#f2f2f2
| colspan=4 align=center | 
|}

References 

074001-075000